Tun Tan Siew Sin (21 May 1916 – 17 March 1988) was a Malaysian politician who served as the  Minister of Commerce and Industry, Minister of Finance, and 3rd President of the Malaysian Chinese Association (MCA, formerly Malayan Chinese Association), a major component party of Alliance and later Barisan Nasional (BN) coalitions. In his term as the Minister of Finance, a new Malaysian currency, Malaysian Ringgit was introduced. He is the longest-serving Minister of Finance by serving in the position for 15 years.

Early life
The only son of Malaysian statesman and MCA founder Tan Cheng Lock, Tan Siew Sin was born on 21 May 1916 in Malacca.  He was of Baba heritage and did not speak Mandarin.  He was educated at Malacca High School in Malacca and then at Raffles College in Singapore. Before then, he was also sent by his father to a Girls School, that is Suydaim Girls School which is now the Methodist High School.

In 1935, he felt ill and was diagnosed as having tuberculosis. He fully recovered after an operation in Switzerland for treatment. Three years later, he moved on to his higher education in the field of law in England. He never completed his legal studies. Fearing an outbreak of war in Europe, in July 1939 Tun Tan Cheng Lock ordered him and his two sisters to leave London and return to Malacca. On Sept 1, 1939, Hitler invaded Poland, an event that marked the start of World War II. For this reason, He studied only one year of law. He returned from London to take over the family's plantation business in 1939.

Political career
Tan Siew Sin was elected a Member of Parliament for Malacca in 1955.  He joined the Malaysian cabinet first as minister of trade and industry, and later became the finance minister in 1959.  He then took over as president of the MCA in November 1961, and held on to both positions until 1974. Tan was appointed the Deputy Chairman of the Alliance in 1964. He led his party to victory in the 1964 General Election, winning 27 of the 33 parliamentary seats contested.

Tan however came under criticism for not pushing for the recognition of Mandarin as an official language and the establishment of a Mandarin language university.  In March 1968, Tan proposed setting up the Tunku Abdul Rahman College for Chinese youths who would otherwise be denied an opportunity to tertiary education. The college was formally set up on February 24, 1969. Under Tan's stewardship, the MCA also set up Koperasi Serbaguna Malaysia (KSM), an initiative of MCA Youth based on the cooperative principle.

In the 1969 general election, MCA lost more than half its seats to the new, mainly Chinese Malaysian, opposition parties Democratic Action Party (DAP) and Parti Gerakan Rakyat Malaysia (Gerakan).  Tan considered taking the party out of the Alliance but decided against it.  In order to regain Chinese support, Tan attempted to broaden the appeal of the party previously seen as a party of the taukeh (tou jia, rich men), and invited professionals to join the party. Other initiatives included the Chinese Unity Movement and the Perak Task Force to help built support in New Villages in Perak.  In 1973, Tan Siew Sin requested a position as Deputy Prime Minister in the cabinet reshuffle following the death of Tun Dr. Ismail, but this was refused by Tun Abdul Razak, which angered greedy Tan. Tan retired from politics on 8 April 1974 after undergoing lung surgery. After his resignation he became a financial advisor to the government on economic issues.

Business career

After his retirement from politics, Tan was nominated chairman of Sime Darby by Tun Hussein Onn.  He was also the chairman of United Malacca Rubber Estates, and sat on the boards of a number of companies, including Unitac, Siemens, Pacific Bank, Highlands & Lowlands, and Guardian Royal Exchange Assurance.

Death
Tan Siew Sin died on 17 March 1988 in Kuala Lumpur, and was buried in the family burial ground in Malacca.

His widow, Catherine Lim Cheng Neo, whom he married  on 8 February 1947 was an active campaigner for family planning. They had three daughters.

In Kuala Lumpur, there is a street, Jalan Tun Tan Siew Sin (formerly Jalan Silang) which was renamed after him in 2003.  At Tunku Abdul Rahman University College 's Main Campus in Kuala Lumpur there is a new building named after him, known as "Bangunan Tun Tan Siew Sin".

Honours

Honours of Malaysia
  :
  Recipient of the Malaysian Commemorative Medal (Gold) (PPM) (1965)
  Grand Commander of the Order of Loyalty to the Crown of Malaysia (SSM) – Tun (1967)
  :
  Knight Grand Commander of the Order of the Crown of Selangor (SPMS) – Dato' Seri (1985)

References 

 Pioners FFPAM (Federation of Family Planning Associations, Malaysia) website, accessed 20 August 2005.
 World Book Encyclopedia, Australasian edition, 1966

External links
Biography of Tan Siew Sin from Malaysian Chinese Association
Tan Siew Sin from Malaysia Factbook

1916 births
1988 deaths
Government ministers of Malaysia
People from Malacca
Peranakan people in Malaysia
Presidents of Malaysian Chinese Association
Malaysian people of Hokkien descent
Malaysian people of Chinese descent
Malaysian politicians of Chinese descent
Members of the Dewan Rakyat
Grand Commanders of the Order of Loyalty to the Crown of Malaysia
Finance ministers of Malaysia
Knights Grand Commander of the Order of the Crown of Selangor